Santana's Greatest Hits is a 1974 compilation album by Santana. It offers highlights from the group's first three albums. It is the band's best-selling compilation album, selling over 7 million copies in the U.S.

Three of the tracks are the edited single versions, as annotated below.

Track listing
 "Evil Ways" (Single version) (Clarence "Sonny" Henry) (from Santana, 1969) - 3:00
 "Jin-go-lo-ba" (Babatunde Olatunji) from Santana - 2:44
 "Hope You're Feeling Better" (Gregg Rolie) (from Abraxas, 1970) - 4:11
 "Samba Pa Ti" (Carlos Santana) (from Abraxas) - 4:47
 "Persuasion" (Single version) (Santana, Rolie, José Areas, David Brown, Michael Shrieve, Michael Carabello) (from Santana) - 2:34
 "Black Magic Woman" (Single version) (Peter Green) (from Abraxas) - 3:17
 "Oye Como Va" (Tito Puente) (from Abraxas) - 4:19
 "Everything's Coming Our Way" (Santana) (from Santana III, 1971) - 3:16
 "Se a Cabó" (Areas) (from Abraxas) - 2:51
 "Everybody's Everything" (Santana, Tyrone Moss, Brown) (from Santana III) - 3:31

Charts

Weekly charts

Year-end charts

Certifications and sales

References

1974 greatest hits albums
Santana (band) compilation albums